Hubert Myatt Green (December 28, 1946 – June 19, 2018) was an American professional golfer who won 29 professional golf tournaments, including two major championships: the 1977 U.S. Open and the 1985 PGA Championship. He was inducted into the World Golf Hall of Fame in 2007.

Early life
Green was born in Birmingham, Alabama.  He attended and played golf for Shades Valley High School in Birmingham and then Florida State University (FSU) in Tallahassee, Florida.  While at FSU, he won the Southern Amateur in 1966 on his home course at the Country Club of Birmingham.  In 1967, he became the Alabama Amateur golf champion, a title he successfully defended in 1968.  He also won the Cape Coral Inter-Collegiate Tournament by eight strokes and the Miami Invitational by five strokes, among others.  His fourth-place finish in the 1968 U.S. Amateur in Columbus, Ohio, earned him an invitation to play in the 1969 Masters as an amateur.  Green graduated from FSU in 1968 with a degree in marketing.  That year he also enlisted in the Alabama National Guard at Enterprise, Alabama.  However, in 1969, Green won the Southern Amateur for a second time, and as one of the top 10 amateurs in the country, he decided to turn pro.  He took a year to earn his PGA of America credentials.

Career
In his 26 years on the PGA Tour, Green had 19 victories, including two major championships: the 1977 U.S. Open at Southern Hills Country Club in Tulsa, Oklahoma, and the 1985 PGA Championship at Cherry Hills Country Club in Cherry Hills Village, Colorado. He finished in the top-25 in a third of the PGA Tour events he entered. He also played on three Ryder Cup teams (1977, 1979, and 1985) and was undefeated in singles play.

In 1971, Green won the Houston Champions International and was the PGA Tour's Rookie of the Year.  He went on to multiple victories throughout 1970s, but he was at his peak in the latter part of that decade.

In March 1976, Green won three PGA Tour events in consecutive weeks.

At the 1977 U.S. Open, as Green walked to the 15th tee of the final round, he was notified of a caller anonymously phoning in a death threat on his life.  The police presented him with options, and he courageously opted to play on, winning by one stroke over Lou Graham.

A month later at the 1977 Open Championship at Turnberry, Green finished third behind Tom Watson and Jack Nicklaus, who were respectively eleven and ten shots clear of Green in their famous "Duel in the Sun." Alluding to the extent to which Watson and Nicklaus's scores were so significantly clear of the rest of the field, he notably remarked, "I won the other tournament".

Green was ranked third in Mark McCormack's world golf rankings in 1977, having also won the 1977 Irish Open in August. He was also runner-up, one stroke behind, to Baldovino Dassù, at the 1976 Dunlop Masters.

Green finished in the top 10 of the Masters six times in seven years from 1974 to 1980.  At the 1978 Masters he came to the final hole about 30 minutes after Gary Player had finished a round of 64. Player had a 1-shot lead over Green, who hit a good drive and then a great approach to within three feet of the cup.  Green had to back away from the putt when he overheard radio announcer Jim Kelly say something.  When Green took the stroke, he pushed it a little to the right and the putt slid by.  Green never blamed Kelly, however, telling Golf Digest, "Only an amateur would have been put off by the interruption — or would try to make excuses about it."

At the 1985 PGA Championship, Green won his second major title, two strokes ahead of defending champion Lee Trevino.  It was Green's 19th and final victory on the PGA Tour.

In 1998, his second season on the Senior PGA Tour (now PGA Tour Champions), Green won the Bruno's Memorial Classic in his hometown of Birmingham, Alabama. He shot a final round of 64, playing the last six holes with an eagle, four birdies, and one par to beat Hale Irwin by one stroke.

Green was also active in golf course design, having worked on TPC Southwind, the site for the PGA Tour's St. Jude Classic; Reynolds Plantation in Greensboro, Georgia; and Greystone Golf & Country Club, the site of his Bruno's Classic victory.

Green retired as a touring professional in 2009.

Cancer survivor
In the spring of 2003, Green was diagnosed with oral cancer after his dentist noticed an unusual swelling on the back of his tongue after a routine cleaning and referred him to a medical specialist for evaluation. Green underwent a very difficult and painful regimen of radiation and chemotherapy treatments during the summer of 2003. By the end of 2003, however, his cancer was in remission; his weight crept up to 165 pounds from a low of 143 pounds.

Honors
Green was inducted into the Florida State Seminoles Hall of Fame in 1977, becoming the first golfer to be enshrined. He was inducted into the Alabama Sports Hall of Fame in 1987 and the Southern Amateur Hall of Fame in 2006. He received the Champions Tour Comeback Player of the Year award in 2002 and 2004, and the American Cancer Life Inspiration Award in 2004. At the 2005 Masters Tournament, Green was presented with the Ben Hogan Award for continuing to be active in golf despite a serious illness. In 2007, he was recognized again when he was inducted into the World Golf Hall of Fame.

Death
Green died on June 19, 2018, aged 71, from complications due to throat cancer.

Amateur wins
this list may be incomplete
1966 Southern Amateur
1967 Alabama Amateur
1968 Alabama Amateur, Cape Coral Invitational, Miami Invitational
1969 Southern Amateur

Professional wins (29)

PGA Tour wins (19)

PGA Tour playoff record (2–3)

European Tour wins (3)

Japan Golf Tour wins (2)

Japan Golf Tour playoff record (1–0)

Other wins (1)

Senior PGA Tour wins (4)

Champions Tour playoff record (1–1)

Other senior wins (2)
1999 Liberty Mutual Legends of Golf (with Gil Morgan)
2017 Bass Pro Shops Legends of Golf – Legends Division (with Allen Doyle)

Major championships

Wins (2)

Results timeline

CUT = missed the halfway cut (3rd round cut in 1982 and 1984 Open Championships)
DQ = disqualified
WD = withdrew
"T" indicates a tie for a place.

Summary

Most consecutive cuts made – 16 (1974 Masters – 1978 Masters)
Longest streak of top-10s – 3 (twice)

Results in The Players Championship

CUT = missed the halfway cut
WD = withdrew
"T" indicates a tie for a place

U.S. national team appearances
Professional
Ryder Cup: 1977 (winners), 1979 (winners), 1985
World Cup: 1977

See also
1970 PGA Tour Qualifying School graduates
List of Florida State Seminoles men's golfers
List of golfers with most PGA Tour wins
List of longest PGA Tour win streaks

References

External links

American male golfers
Florida State Seminoles men's golfers
PGA Tour golfers
PGA Tour Champions golfers
Winners of men's major golf championships
Ryder Cup competitors for the United States
World Golf Hall of Fame inductees
Golf course architects
Golfers from Birmingham, Alabama
People from Mountain Brook, Alabama
People from Panama City, Florida
Deaths from throat cancer
Deaths from cancer in Alabama
1946 births
2018 deaths